The Storyteller of Venice (Italian: Il Cantastorie di Venezia) is a 1929 Italian silent comedy film directed by Retti Marsani and starring Hertha von Walther and Luigi Serventi.

Cast
 Luigi Serventi as Adolfo
 Hertha von Walther as Nina
 Pietro Cimarro as  il barone
 Daisy Lorand as  Maria Rosa
 Roberto Pasetti as Marco, il cantastorie
 Gildo Bocci 
 Alfredo Martinelli

References

Bibliography
 Reich, Jacqueline & Garofalo, Piero. Re-viewing Fascism: Italian Cinema, 1922-1943. Indiana University Press, 2002.

External links

1929 films
Films directed by Retti Marsani
Italian silent feature films
1929 comedy films
Italian comedy films
Italian black-and-white films
Silent comedy films
1920s Italian films
1920s Italian-language films